Rendova is an island in the Western Province of the Solomon Islands in the South Pacific, east of Papua New Guinea.

Geography
Rendova Island is a roughly rectangularly-shaped island, located in the South Pacific in the New Georgia Islands. The length of the island is about 40 kilometers. To the north is the island of New Georgia and to the east is the island of Vangunu. The island is surrounded in some places by a coral reef. The climate on Rendova is wet and tropical, and the island is subject to frequent cyclones.

Flora and fauna
The black-sand beaches along the southwest coast of Rendova are important nesting grounds for the critically endangered leatherback turtle.  Community-based conservation organisation, the Tetepare Descendants' Association, runs a leatherback conservation program in the villages of Baniata, Havilla and Retavo on this coastline.

Population
In 1999, the population of Rendova was estimated at 3,679 people. There are two indigenous languages spoken on Rendova Island: the Austronesian language Ughele in the north, and the Papuan language Touo in the south.

History

On March 15, 1893, Rendova was declared part of the British Solomon Islands protectorate. The island was occupied by the Empire of Japan in the early stages of World War II. On June 30, 1943, Allied forces carried out the landings on Rendova which quickly overcame the 300-man Japanese garrison as part of a strategy to ultimately recapture Munda and its airfield on the island of New Georgia. The island was subsequently used as a base by the United States Navy for  PT boat operations. Solomon Islanders Biuku Gasa and Eroni Kumana paddled their dugout canoe 35 miles (60 km) to reach the base and deliver a message inscribed on a coconut from then-Lieutenant (junior grade) John F. Kennedy after his PT boat, PT 109, was run down by the Japanese destroyer HIJMS Amagiri and he and his crew were stranded on one of the local islands.

Since 1978, the island has been part of the independent state of the Solomon Islands

In popular culture
Rendova is the setting for the 2002 humorous book Solomon Time by Will Randall, about a British school teacher who moves to a village on Rendova to help organise a community project.

References

External links

 http://www.tetepare.org/
Global Volcanism Project

Islands of the Solomon Islands
Western Province (Solomon Islands)